The Royal Observer Corps (ROC) was a civil defence organisation intended for the visual detection, identification, tracking and reporting of aircraft over Great Britain. It operated in the United Kingdom between 29 October 1925 and 31 December 1995, when the Corps' civilian volunteers were stood down (ROC headquarters staff at RAF Bentley Priory stood down on 31 March 1996). Composed mainly of civilian spare-time volunteers, ROC personnel wore a Royal Air Force (RAF) style uniform and latterly came under the administrative control of RAF Strike Command and the operational control of the Home Office. Civilian volunteers were trained and administered by a small cadre of professional full-time officers under the command of the Commandant Royal Observer Corps; latterly a serving RAF Air Commodore.

Overview 
In 1925, following a Defence Committee initiative undertaken the previous year, the formation of an RAF command concerning the Air Defence of Great Britain led to the provision of a Raid Reporting System, itself delegated to a sub-committee consisting of representatives from the Air Ministry, Home Office and the General Post Office. This Raid Reporting System was to provide for the visual detection, identification, tracking and reporting of aircraft over Great Britain, and was eventually to become known as the Observer Corps. The Observer Corps was subsequently awarded the title Royal by His Majesty King George VI in April 1941, in recognition of service carried out by Observer Corps personnel during the Battle of Britain.

Throughout the remainder of the Second World War, the ROC continued to complement and at times replace the Chain Home defensive radar system by undertaking an inland aircraft tracking and reporting function, while Chain Home provided a predominantly coastal, long-range tracking and reporting system. With the advent of the Cold War, the ROC continued in its primary role of aircraft recognition and reporting, and in 1955 was allocated the additional task of detecting and reporting nuclear explosions and associated fall-out. By 1965, thanks to advances in (radar) technology, most roles and responsibilities relating to aircraft had been withdrawn and the ROC assumed the role of field force for the United Kingdom Warning and Monitoring Organisation (UKWMO); a role which the ROC continued until the early 1990s and the cessation of the Cold War.

By the late 1980s the ROC comprised 69 professional full-time officers, approximately 10,500 civilian spare-time volunteers, and over 100 Ministry of Defence (MoD) civilian support staff. At HQROC (RAF Bentley Priory), over a dozen full-time secretarial, clerical and other administrative staff were present. Each of the five Area HQs were staffed by a clerical officer and a typist, and each of the 25 Group HQs were staffed by a clerical officer, typist and handyperson. (Many MoD civilian support staff were also civilian spare-time volunteers.)

Following the UK Government's Options for Change defence spending review in 1990, the vast majority of the civilian spare-time volunteers were stood down on 30 September 1991, with the remainder being stood down on 31 December 1995. The closure of HQROC on 31 March 1996 and redeployment of those few remaining HQROC staff marked the disbandment of the ROC after over 70 years of service.

First World War 
 

The ROC can trace its roots to the First World War and the requirement for a warning system to bolster UK defences, predominantly over south-east England, against bombing raids by Zeppelin airships of the German Luftstreitkräfte. A system of observation posts and observers was organised, with a network of approximately 200 posts established in strategic areas. Initially these posts were manned by British Army personnel, who were in turn replaced by Special (Police) Constables, and posts were coordinated on an area basis with telephone communications provided between themselves and their associated anti-aircraft defences.

In 1917 Germany began to deploy increasing numbers of fixed-wing bombers, with the result that the number of airship raids decreased rapidly in favour of raids by such aircraft. In response to this new threat, Major General Edward Bailey Ashmore, a Royal Flying Corps pilot who later commanded an artillery division in Belgium, was appointed to devise an improved system of detection, communication and control. The system, called the Metropolitan Observation Service, encompassed the London Air Defence Area and later extended eastwards towards the Kentish and Essex coasts.

The Metropolitan Observation Service met with some success and although not fully operational until late 1918 (the last German bombing raid taking place on 19 May 1918), the lessons learned were to prove invaluable for future developments in the field of aircraft observation, identification and reporting.

Interwar period 

By the end of 1920, the observation-post networks and their associated anti-aircraft hardware had been decommissioned, and in 1922 the responsibility for air defence was transferred from the War Office (responsible for the army) to the Air Ministry.

Following this transfer, Major General Ashmore, who had been responsible for air defence during World War I, reported to a new Air Raid Precautions (ARP) committee, established in January 1924. In areas surrounding Romney Marsh and the Weald a series of trials were undertaken to develop a Raid Reporting System which would employ an optimum arrangement of observation posts and associated control-centres. During 1925 these trials were further extended to cover parts of the counties of Essex and Hampshire, and by October a proven modus operandi had been developed for a new organisation to be known as the Observer Corps, which was established on 29 October 1925.

Within a year four groups operated in South East England, covering much of Kent, Sussex, Hampshire and Essex, with the intention that a total of eighteen groups would cover the whole of Great Britain. The system required cooperation between and the participation of the RAF, the army, the British police forces and the General Post Office (GPO). (The GPO at that time operated Britain's national telecommunications system.) In January 1926 county police constabularies recruited observers as special constables, and each observation post was manned by a sergeant and six special constables. Recruits were spare-time volunteers who received neither pay, uniform, nor allowances. Individual volunteers purchased the only distinguishing insignia, Observer Corps lapel badges, at their own expense.

In 1929 the control of the Observer Corps passed from the county police forces to the Air Ministry, although Chief Constables retained responsibility for personnel and recruitment matters. 1 March 1929 saw the establishment of the new Headquarters of the Observer Corps at Hillingdon House, RAF Uxbridge in the west of London, and Air Commodore Edward A D Masterman CB CMG CBE AFC RAF (Rtd) was appointed as the first commandant of the Observer Corps. Air Cdre Masterman held this appointment until his retirement on 1 March 1936, and was succeeded by Air Commodore Alfred Warrington-Morris CG CMG OBE AFC RAF (Rtd), who would lead the Observer Corps through the critical period during the Second World War which saw the RAF emerge bruised but victorious following the Battle of Britain of 1940.

During the 1930s the number of groups increased until by 1936, England had a full coverage of observation posts south-east of a line between Flamborough Head in Yorkshire and Poole Harbour in Dorset. In 1936 the Headquarters of the Observer Corps relocated from RAF Uxbridge to RAF Bentley Priory in north-west London. By 1939 a system of observation posts covered practically the whole of Great Britain, with the western parts of Wales and Scotland together with England's West Country incorporated during 1940. The final group, Portree in the Western Isles, formed in 1941.

Second World War

Preparation

At the end of September 1938 the political crisis which culminated in the Munich Agreement had led to the Observer Corps being mobilised for a week. This highlighted organisational and technical shortcomings, and provided the impetus for the development of solutions to resolve these. A series of exercises held throughout 1939 provided opportunities for the fine tuning of improvements made to command and control functions.

At this time the only uniform items issued to Observer Corps personnel were steel helmets bearing the stencilled letters 'O C', together with blue/white (vertically striped) armbands bearing the same. Both items of equipment were similar in style to those issued to members of the civil defence emergency services, including the Auxiliary Fire Service ('AFS') and Air Raid Precautions ('ARP'). The initial batch of helmets issued to Observer Corps members were the same as those issued to Police forces; black in colour with the word 'POLICE' stencilled in white. (This led some Observer Corps members to simply scratch off the stencilled letters P, L, I, and E, to leave letters O and C remaining). High quality Royal Navy-issue binoculars were issued to observers, whose observation posts often consisted of a wooden garden shed located next to a telegraph pole, this arrangement enabling a telecommunications link to be established with a control centre, often via a manual switchboard at local telephone exchange.

These 'garden shed' style observation posts were eventually replaced by more substantial brick structures, protected by sandbags, which due to their often having been constructed by Observer Corps personnel themselves meant that no two posts were identical. Observation posts were located in open playing fields, hilltops or cliff edges and, particularly in urban areas, on the rooftops of public buildings and factories. Purpose-built observation posts introduced later were usually two-storey structures, constructed of brick or concrete with an open-topped observation platform above a small crew rest area.

Early days of the war

On 24 August 1939 Chief Constables issued Mobilisation Notices to all members of the Observer Corps, with war being declared just ten days afterwards. From 3 September 1939, observation posts and control centres would be manned continuously until 12 May 1945, four days after VE Day.

The first months of the Second World War were known as the Phoney War, with little significant enemy aircraft activity over Great Britain. The Battle of Dunkirk commenced at the end of May 1940, with Allied troops cut off in retreat by the German Army in north-east France, resulting in the evacuation of British troops in Operation Dynamo. During this time the RAF lost a total of 944 aircraft, with half of these being fighter aircraft. Observer Corps posts in Kent and around the Thames estuary were able to play some part in plotting aircraft while they were over south east England. This was a useful period of exposure to war-time operations for Observer Corps personnel, and one which would provide invaluable experience.

Despite it being crucial that armed service personnel could correctly identify the various types of allied and German aircraft operating in the skies above and around Great Britain, in 1939 aircraft recognition was not yet the highly developed skill it was to become in the Observer Corps. Other armed services regarded accurate aircraft identification as being almost impossible; observers, however, realised that skills in this area were deficient, and the profile of aircraft recognition was raised within the ranks of the Observer Corps. Aircraft recognition training material, consisting of aircraft silhouettes and other data, was introduced almost entirely under the auspices of the unofficial Observer Corps Club. Only much later did this skill obtain official recognition, with the result that it eventually spread throughout the armed forces.

Battle of Britain

After the Fall of France, the goal of Germany was to achieve air superiority over Great Britain by destroying RAF fighters, both in the air and on the ground, and by bombing aircraft manufacturing facilities. Winning the Battle of Britain, as it became known, was Germany's prerequisite in preparation for the invasion of Britain; Operation Sea Lion.

The British Chain Home radar defence system was able to warn of enemy aircraft approaching the British coast, but once having crossed the coastline the Observer Corps provided the only means of tracking their position. During the period from July to October 1940, the Observer Corps was at full stretch operating 24 hours a day, 7 days a week, plotting enemy aircraft and passing this essential information to RAF Fighter Command Groups and Sector Controls. (ROC personnel were deployed in two specific roles: Those in Class A were required to undertake 56 hours duty per week, while Class B personnel undertook up to 24 hours duty per week). The Battle of Britain also saw the introduction of the Blitz campaign and the shift of German bombing from airfields to cities. Again, the Observer Corps provided vital information which enabled timely air-raid warnings to be issued, thereby saving countless lives. The Blitz itself continued until early in the summer of 1941 and bombing continued, albeit on a reduced scale, until March 1945. The Observer Corps formed the cornerstone of Air Marshal Hugh Dowding's air defence system, who stated in a despatch following the Battle of Britain that:

It is important to note that at this time they (the Observer Corps) constituted the whole means of tracking enemy raids once they had crossed the coastline. Their work throughout was quite invaluable. Without it the air-raid warning systems could not have been operated and inland interceptions would rarely have been made.

As a result of their role during the Battle of Britain, in April 1941 the Observer Corps was granted the title Royal by King George VI, and the Royal Observer Corps (ROC) became a uniformed civil defence organisation administered by RAF Fighter Command. Also during that same year, in a change from the policy of the Observer Corps, the ROC undertook to recruit women personnel for the first time. Initially, the only uniforms provided were RAF overalls, (boiler suits), with an ROC breast badge, commonly referred to as the "soup plate" because of its shape and size. Standard issue RAF No.2 Battledress uniforms were issued in a rolling programme over the next two years. For the remainder of the war, the ROC would provide an essential part of Great Britain's air defences.

Seaborne Observers
In 1944, during preparations for the invasion of France, (Operation Overlord), a request for volunteers from within the ranks of the ROC produced 1,094 highly qualified candidates, from which 796 were selected to perform aircraft recognition duties as Seaborne Observers.

These Seaborne Observers, under the command of Group Commandant C.G. Cooke, undertook specialist training at the Royal Bath Hotel, Bournemouth, prior to being temporarily seconded to the Royal Navy with the rank of Petty Officer (Aircraft Identifier). The Seaborne Observers continued to wear their ROC uniform, but in addition wore a "SEABORNE" shoulder flash and Royal Navy brassard bearing the letters "RN". During the D-day landings, two Seaborne Observers were allocated to all participating US Navy vessels and Defensively Equipped Merchant Ships. The Seaborne Observers assumed control of each ship's anti aircraft batteries with the intention of reducing the previously high incidence of friendly fire (collateral damage) between allied vessels and allied aircraft. The success of the Seaborne Observers in undertaking this role can be measured by a signal sent from Wing Commander P.B. Lucas, Air Staff Officer, who stated that:

The general impression amongst the Spitfire wings, covering our land and naval forces over and off the beach-head, appears to be that in the majority of cases the fire has come from British Navy warships and not from the merchant ships. Indeed I personally have yet to hear a single pilot report that a merchant vessel had opened fire on him

During Operation Overlord a total of two Seaborne Observers lost their lives, several more were injured and twenty two survived their ships being sunk. In addition, ten Seaborne Observers were mentioned in despatches. The deployment of Seaborne Observers was regarded as an unqualified success and in recognition for their contribution to the success of the landings, King George Vl approved the permanent wearing of the SEABORNE shoulder flash on the ROC uniforms of those individuals who had taken part. Following the invasion, Air Chief Marshal Trafford Leigh-Mallory wrote a message which was circulated to all ROC personnel:

Seaborne Observers remain the only members of the ROC whose service during World War II entitles them to wear the HM Armed Forces Veterans Badge, their qualifying for such resulting from the approximately ten-week period of secondment to the Royal Navy. (The ROC itself was never a component of HM Armed Forces; ROC members being non-combatants during wartime with the exception of full-time officers who could be armed and therefore legally classed as combatants). A Seaborne Observers' Association exists with Air Vice Marshal George Black CB OBE AFC RAF (Rtd), a former Commandant ROC, acting as Honorary President.

Flying bombs 
Intelligence reports detailing the threat posed by Germany's flying bombs resulted in the instigation of Operation Totter, whereby ROC posts would fire 'Snowflake' illuminating rocket flares in order to alert RAF fighters to the presence of V-1 flying bombs. Observers at the coastal post of Dymchurch identified the very first of these weapons and within seconds of their report the defences were in action.

This new weapon gave the ROC much additional work, both at posts and control centres. RAF fighter controllers temporarily moved their radio equipment into the operations rooms of ROC control centres at Horsham and Maidstone in order to direct fighters to intercept V-1 flying bombs using information displayed on ROC plotting tables. Critics who had earlier claimed that the ROC would be unable to assist the new fast-flying Gloster Meteor jet aircraft were answered when these aircraft, on their first operational combat sorties to intercept V-1s, were controlled entirely using ROC derived information. The optimism shown by the then Commandant ROC, Air Cdre Crerar, that the ROC would cope with this new technology was vindicated.

The first V1 over London is credited as spotted by Sydney Fenton of the ROC.

Organisation and modus operandi 

The headquarters of each ROC Group operated from a control Centre, responsible for and controlled between 30 and 40 observation Posts, each of which would be some 10 km to 20 km from its neighbour. By 1945 there were 39 centres covering Great Britain, controlling in total more than 1,500 posts. (The ROC did not operate in Northern Ireland until 1954).

In order to monitor aircraft, observers used a simple but effective mechanical tracking device. Where the approximate height of an aircraft is known it becomes possible, by using a horizontal bearing and a vertical angle taken from a known point, to calculate the approximate position of that aircraft. Posts were equipped with a mechanical sighting Post Instrument plotter consisting of a sighting system over a map grid. After setting the instrument with the aircraft's approximate height, the observer would align a sighting bar with the aircraft. This bar was mechanically connected to a vertical pointer which would indicate the approximate position of the aircraft on the map grid. Observers would report the map coordinates, height, time, sector clock code and number of aircraft for each sighting to the aircraft Plotters located at the Centre. Positioned around a large table map, plotters would wear headsets to enable a constant communications link to be maintained with their allocated Cluster of posts, usually three in number.

The plotting table consisted of a large map with grid squares and posts being marked. Counters were placed on the map at the reported aircraft's position, each counter indicating the height and number of aircraft, and a colour-coded system was used to indicated the time of observation in 5-minute segments. The table was surrounded by plotters, responsible for communicating with their allocated cluster of posts. Over time the track of aircraft could be traced, with the system of colour-coding enabling the extrapolation of tracks and the removal of time expired (historical) data. From 1942, long-range boards were introduced into centre operations rooms, with Tellers communicating with neighbouring ROC groups in order to handover details of inbound and outbound aircraft tracks as they were plotted on this map.

Specific duties in the centre operations room included those undertaken by:
 Plotters – responsible for updating the plotting table and long range board
 Tellers – responsible for communicating with neighbouring ROC groups, Fighter Command Group and Sector controls, anti-aircraft batteries and searchlight units
 Alarm Controllers – responsible for liaising with the Police, the National Alert System, the Ministry of Home Security and with local industrial facilities
 Interrogator – responsible for liaising with ground controlled interception (GCI) radar units
 Duty Controller – together with an Assistant Duty Controller and Post Controller, responsible for supervising both the centre plotters and group observation posts

A royal visit 

Perhaps the most unusual ROC post location was No.17 Group (Watford) Easy-4 Windsor Post, nestling between the battlements and chimneys on the top of  Windsor Castle's Brunswick Tower. Reporting for duty through the castle gates, many newly appointed ROC Group officers were caught unawares when the castle guardsmen in their sentry boxes snapped smartly to attention and presented arms. Observers frequently encountered King George VI, Queen Elizabeth and Princess Elizabeth and Princess Margaret in the castle grounds, where they would often make a point of stopping to enquire as to ROC activities.

On one occasion the observers on duty received a one-minute advance warning from a royal footman that they were about to receive a royal visit. A few minutes later, the king and queen, together with the teenage Princess Elizabeth, climbed up the steep ladder and joined the observers on the darkened roof-top while a major V-1 flying bomb attack was taking place over London. The royal visitors stayed for over an hour, asking technical questions and looking through binoculars at the unfolding aerial battle. Prior to departing, the royal party autographed the post duty log. The following evening, the royal party again appeared and on this occasion stayed for a longer period, although there was little aerial activity due to poor weather.

In the early 1960s, when the nuclear reporting role building programme was in full swing, the ROC post at Windsor relocated to the cellar beneath the Brunswick Tower and a partial monitoring room was excavated under the garden in front of the tower's base. The BPI (Bomb Power Indicator) and FSM (Fixed Survey Meter) instrument fittings on the lawn were visible to the many tourists visiting the castle, although few would have realised their significance. The observers at the Windsor post were unique in the country in not having to provide their own food during exercises. Instead, they received hot meals, brought by royal footman, from the castle kitchens. Twelve months after the ROC post was closed, the Brunswick Tower was the starting point and seat of the 1992 Windsor Castle fire and was substantially damaged.

Ghosts in ROC uniforms 

The ROC provided an additional and highly useful function to the war-time UK Government by providing a plausible cover story for a number of covert war-time operations. Up to twenty highly secret electronic warfare units and Y-stations were established across the UK, with their associated scientists, technicians and engineers being dressed in Royal Observer Corps uniforms so as to avoid arousing any suspicion while entering and leaving Royal Air Force, Army, Royal Navy and other MoD establishments.

Throughout the Second World War, ROC personnel were paid expenses and allowances in cash via their Group HQ and several Deputy Group Commandants discovered that they had up to one hundred additional observers appearing on their staff roll, with each additional observer being seen to receiving higher than normal allowances, despite these individuals having never reported for duty as members of the Royal Observer Corps.

A notable example of one such cover story involving the ROC is that which took place at RAF Little Rissington, where a series of tunnels were excavated during the 1940s. RAF Little Rissington forces personnel and local residents were informed that this activity was associated with an ROC unit, which was indeed seen to be manned by individuals wearing ROC uniforms. The ROC however had no knowledge of the existence of this supposed ROC facility until many years after the war had drawn to a close.

The true nature of the activities of these Ghost ROC personnel remains classified information, with public access to related documents being denied until 2045.

Briefly stood down 
On 12 May 1945, when it was confirmed that the Luftwaffe had ceased combat operations, the ROC stood down. In recognition of the contribution made by ROC personnel in the Allied victory, the Air Ministry held a massed RAF rally and air display at RAF North Weald, in Essex, from Saturday 23 to Monday 25 June 1945. Over 2,000 ROC personnel were invited to attend, with at least two observers from each ROC facility representing their respective post or centre. As part of the event, the new ensign of the ROC (a Royal Air Force Ensign, defaced with the ROC badge in the fly in place of the RAF roundel – a design approved by King George VI), was dedicated at a special service.

On the day of the dedication of the ensign, (Sunday 24th), the approximately 2,000 observers present undertook the first ever uniformed ROC march-past to the accompaniment of the RAF Band, with the Under-Secretary of State for Air, Lord Beatty, taking the salute. The parade then formed into a huge square and the ROC Ensign was presented by Lord Beatty. The Ensign was borne from the drumhead by Observer Lieutenant Pollock, VC. During the parade, Observer Lieutenant Pollock carried the Ensign, flanked by two senior NCOs, at the head of the massed contingent of observers. A film record of these events is held in the archives at the Imperial War Museum. However, in a matter of only a few months, the ROC would again be called upon to meet the challenges posed by a new threat: the Cold War.

The Cold War

A change of role 
In September 1947, over a year after VE Day, the ROC held the first of a series of small scale exercises in southern England, which included for the first time substantial numbers of jet aircraft, principally in the form of the Gloster Meteor. The following year the first large scale exercise took place over a four-day period; in the latter half of which radar was used as the sole means of monitoring and controlling participating aircraft. By the mid-1950s, the greater speeds and altitudes attained by jet aircraft combined with the improved performance of radar led to a reduced requirement on the part of the RAF for the services of the ROC in tracking aircraft. However, to compensate for a reduced role with regard to aircraft, an additional role for the ROC, in the form of defending against the effects of nuclear weapons, was announced in June 1955. The first significant exercise undertaken by the ROC involving a simulated nuclear attack took place during 1956, and by the following year the British Government had concluded that the combination of a risk of nuclear attack and a need for a nuclear deterrent would be the overriding considerations which would shape UK defence policy. With that view firmly in place, any pretence that an aircraft recognition and reporting role for the ROC would continue all but disappeared.

In 1957, the United Kingdom Warning and Monitoring Organisation (UKWMO) was established under Home Office control. It was intended that the UKWMO would provide both civil and military authorities in the UK with essential information during a nuclear attack, with the ROC providing primary data on the position and magnitude of atomic weapons detonated during any such attack. This data would be used by the UKWMO, in conjunction with weather information provided by the Meteorological Office, to produce a forecast of radioactive fallout. Fallout would be monitored as and where it occurred, with its actual location and strength mapped using data obtained from instrumentation at ROC posts. Such information when combined with ROCMet, (data concerning actual wind speed and direction obtained from cluster Master Posts equipped with wind anemometers and other basic meteorological instruments), would permit the dissemination of accurate forecasts predicting the distribution and strength of nuclear fallout.

Restructuring and reconstruction 
In 1962, the forty ROC Groups were reorganised and reduced in number to thirty-one, with a further reduction to twenty-five taking place in 1968. Service age limits of 16 to 65 were introduced, with service after the age of 65 only occurring where replacements could not be recruited, subject to annual review, and where appropriate medical certificates could be provided. (Some individuals acting as wartime post observers had served well into their seventies and eighties, although wartime centre observers had been forced to retire at fifty.)

To enable the ROC to operate in a nuclear environment, changes were necessary to both centres and posts in order to provide protection against blast effects and radiation from nuclear bursts. It would also now be necessary for control centres and observation posts to be occupied for a period of between seven and twenty-one days following any nuclear event. Entry was facilitated by a steel ladder in a vertical shaft leading to a single room, providing accommodation for three observers to live and work, with a separate toilet compartment with chemical closet. Air was circulated from grilled ventilators at both ends of the post and electricity was provided by a crated 12 volt lead–acid battery, charged occasionally by a portable petrol electric generator. New instrumentation detected the peak overpressure from any nuclear burst, together with photographic indications of the burst location and size, plus resulting levels of radiation. Conditions in these spartan posts were cramped, cold, and in some cases damp.
 

ROC centres were renamed as Controls and provided with bomb proof nuclear protected buildings. A small number of these were converted from suitable pre-existing Second World War anti-aircraft operations rooms (AAORs), with the remainder specially constructed as above ground or semi-sunk blockhouse buildings. These were constructed to a standard layout, dependent upon the subsoil composition at the construction site. Controls provided living and operational accommodation for up to a hundred observers and UKWMO warning teams. Included in the centre layout were male and female dormitories, kitchen and canteen provision, life support systems and decontamination facilities, a communications centre and a split level central operations room with balcony positions.

In the vicinity of each control was a compact, brick built shack called the Radiac Store, which housed approximately 20 nuclear radiation sources in the form of milled metal discs. These discs, with strengths of 0.5 röntgen, 1 röntgen, 5 röntgens and 10 röntgens, were securely stored in lead-lined containers. Discs had to be audited monthly which entailed an ROC officer physically counting the discs into the palm of their bare hands, with the results being recorded in a log book. (This task was usually achieved with a degree of haste). Discs were used to calibrate and check the stocks of radiac instruments and for simulated live-training using such instruments. In practice, Health and Safety at Work regulations introduced in the 1970s resulted in radioactive sources being rarely if ever used, and as a result they seldom left the radiac store. Discs were finally withdrawn from service and returned to Aldermaston during the mid-1980s, with the last exercise involving such live radiation sources taking place at RAF West Raynham in 1980, during the annual ROC summer training camp.

Nuclear reporting cells 

During 1958, RAF Fighter Command expressed a desire to obtain data similar to that provided by the ROC in the event of a nuclear attack, specifically that concerning the location of nuclear bursts and the resulting nuclear fallout. The Air Defence Commander at the Air Defence Operations Centre, (ADOC), RAF Bentley Priory, in order to ensure continued operations by RAF mobile and static units, wished to use such data in determining which UK airfields (both civil and military) had been subject to blast damage and/or exposed to any subsequent nuclear fallout.

Due to issues surrounding RAF personnel shortages and training restrictions, HQ Fighter Command formally requested that HQROC assist in providing suitably qualified ROC personnel to staff the Fallout Reporting Sections at both the ADOC and at Fighter Command's Sector Operations Centres, (SOCs). Apart from wartime ROC/RAF Liaison Officers, this was to be the first occasion whereby ROC personnel would undertake their duties within a wholly military operational environment. In case of the ADOC at RAF Bentley Priory, sixteen ROC personnel were required to staff the Fallout Reporting Section, with the operation itself consisting of marking the position of nuclear bursts, and plotting both the reported and predicted path of fallout onto a large, vertical, transparent (perspex) map display. (Two observers working at the rear of the display would plot and update data by writing in 'reverse', thereby enabling an unobstructed view of the front of display). Actual reports of fallout were drawn onto initial templates which, when combined with meteorological forecasts, were used to extrapolate the predicted path and intensity of the fallout. This system enabled initial and subsequent predictions of fallout to be drawn, together with identifying those areas actually being affected.

During October 1958, "Exercise Nightbird", a joint air defence and nuclear fallout exercise, saw ROC personnel undertaking operational duties at the ADOC for the first time. Subsequently, operational RAF Command and Group HQs in the UK received nuclear fallout information over two broadcast circuits from the ADOC, with Fallout Reporting Section map displays at each site being updated by local ROC Special Duties teams.

This system of Fallout Reporting Sections was enhanced further when nuclear burst and fallout data was distributed by ROC Group HQs directly to what became formally designated as ROC Nuclear Reporting Cells (NRC). Nuclear Reporting Cells would go on to be located within several major armed forces HQ throughout the UK, with ROC personnel being responsible for providing the Army, Royal Navy and RAF with comprehensive visual displays and interpretation of data provided by ROC controls.

As a result of such developments taking place throughout the 1970s, a third category of Observer was introduced in addition to Post Observer and Control Observer; that of NRC Observer. The role of NRC Observer combined basic ROC training with specialist scientific skills and training normally reserved for UKWMO warning teams. Similarly, a higher level of security clearance was required by those ROC personnel acting as NRC Observers.

Several Cold War-era government facilities which were also home to NRCs are maintained as museums and are open to the public, including those at Kelvedon Hatch, Hack Green, Dover Castle and Anstruther.

Instrumentation

For the detection of nuclear bursts 
 Atomic Weapons Detection Recognition and Estimation of Yield known as AWDREY was a desk mounted automatic instrument, located at certain selected controls, which detected nuclear explosions and indicated the estimated size of the blast in megatons.
 The Bomb Power Indicator or BPI consisted of a peak overpressure gauge with a dial which would register the pressure wave from a nuclear explosion passing over the instrument.
 The Ground Zero Indicator, or GZI or shadowgraph, consisted of four horizontally mounted cardinal compass point pinhole cameras within a metal drum. Each 'camera' contained a sheet of photosensitive paper on which were printed horizontal and vertical calibration lines and, in effect, photographed the fireball of a nuclear explosion.

For the measurement of Ionizing radiation 
 The Radiac Survey Meter No 2 or RSM, introduced in 1955, counted particles produced by radioactive decay.
 The Fixed Survey Meter or FSM, introduced in 1958, could be operated from within the post with a cable leading to the externally mounted detector which was protected by a polycarbonate dome. The FSM used the same obsolete high voltage (30 V) batteries as the RSM. In 1985 this instrument was replaced by the PDRM 82(F).
 The PDRM82 or Portable Dose Rate Meter and the desktop fixed PDRM 82(F) version of the same meter, manufactured by Plessey, were introduced in 1985.

Measurement of personal absorption 
 The Dosimeter pocket meters were issued to individual observers for measuring their personal levels of radiation absorption.

Communications and technological developments 
Initially, communications between posts and controls were made using former Army-issue head-and-breast communication sets via above-ground telephone lines, these being manually switched by telephone engineers prior to use. Army head-and-breast sets were replaced in 1964 by metal housed "Teletalk" units which only permitted one-way communications when the push-to-talk switch was depressed. The Teletalk units also used manually switched telephone lines, but with integral transistorisation to boost transmission and reception power. In 1981 a new design of Teletalk (AD8010) was introduced by British Telecom together with underground, permanently wired, landline connections that were hardened against the effects of electromagnetic pulse (EMP) from nuclear bursts.

Posts were organised in "clusters" of three, four or five posts, with a single post in each cluster designated as the "Master Post". To guard against the possibility of a cluster being disconnected from the parent control, master posts were provided with radio equipment capable of communicating with the parent control and up to three adjacent controls using separate radio frequencies.

Inter-group control-to-control exchange of burst and radiation data was initially via "teller" voice message using telephone lines between adjacent groups. In 1971 this method was replaced by punched tape data exchanges by telegraph teleprinters located in the communications centre. Between 1981 and 1985 the teleprinters were replaced with modern computerised AD9000 message switch equipment, operating over a permanent and EMP hardened landline network, permitting direct communications between groups nationally. In the late 1980s the manually operated PMBX switchboards were replaced with computerised direct dial SX2000 equipment.
 
During the years immediately prior to the stand down of the ROC, trials were undertaken with the intention of providing monitoring posts with remotely operated above ground petrol generators to provide a constant electricity supply (a portable generator capable of producing both 12 V and 240 V (Yamaha EF1000) was supplied in small quantities to a number of groups), "black" heaters to provide a warmer environment and new sealed, recycling ventilators to allow air changes without requiring the post to be exposed to a contaminated air source.

Rank structure

Commandants Royal Observer Corps 

The Commandant of the Royal Observer Corps was a Royal Air Force officer with the rank of Air Commodore. With only three exceptions, (two Navigators and one General Duties (Ground) Supply Branch officer), all Commandants ROC were RAF pilots with extensive service records and previous command appointments. Had an ROC officer been appointed to the post of Commandant ROC they would have held the rank of Observer Commodore, although no such appointment was ever made.

Rank insignia

Uniform and other insignia 

The ROC crest and cap badge depict a 16th-century soldier holding aloft a flaming torch while shielding his eyes with his free hand, as though looking towards a distant place or object. This central figure is encircled by a wreath of gilt laurel and surmounted by the Royal Crown, the motto being Forewarned is Forearmed. Uniform tunic buttons, lapel badges and the reverse of the ROC Medal also depict the soldier in the same pose while standing beside a coastal signal fire or warning beacon, with a chain of lit beacons extending along the coastline into the far distance. (In this representation it was easy to imagine the figure looking out towards the next beacon in the chain). The symbol of the coast watcher has its origins in the Elizabethan era, where such individuals were organised and paid for by the county sheriff to tend and light beacons to warn of approaching enemies, such as the Spanish Armada of that period.

Unlike an Armed Services unit, (having a regimental colour), the ROC has, in place of such, a Royal Banner. Presented by the Queen, both in 1966 and 1991, these were laid up in 1991, (St Clement Danes), and 1995, (RAF Cranwell), respectively. Unusually, the Imperial State Crown and St Edward's Crown appear together. (The ROC Ensign, first authorised in 1945, differs from the ROC Royal Banner in that from 1952, following the accession of HM Queen Elizabeth II, the ROC badge was thenceforth ensigned with the St Edward's Crown). During October 2015, the Royal Banner at RAF Cranwell was temporarily 'Lodged-Out' to RAF Northolt, prior to being laid up at St Clement Danes Church, where it replaced the 1966 banner.

When the ROC was first issued with RAF style uniforms in 1941, the RAF was able to provide the majority of the uniform items but held insufficient stocks of RAF blue berets. However, at that time the Army held a surplus of black Royal Tank Regiment berets, therefore the ROC was initially issued with black berets, which remained part of the ROC uniform only until a manufacturer was able to produce the prescribed midnight blue berets, which then remained part of the ROC uniform throughout its history. There was a similar shortage of both Sergeant and Corporal stripes. However, there existed a large surplus of rank badges destined for the quasi-military Royal Canadian (Volunteer) Storekeeper Corps who served in UK dockside warehouses during the Second World War. These badges, displaying horizontal bars within a wreath of laurel leaves, were adopted for the ROC, with Chief Storekeeper becoming Chief Observer and Leading Storekeeper becoming Leading Observer. The four bar rank of Master Storekeeper was discounted initially, but was again under consideration in 1990 as an RAF Warrant Officer equivalent rank styled Master Observer; intended to act as dedicated assistants to Crew, Group and NRC officers. However, the decision on whether to introduce the rank of Master Observer was overtaken by the standing down announcement. (The surplus rank badges destined for the Royal Canadian (Volunteer) Storekeeper Corps were also used by the United States' Civilian Technical Corps, who were based in the UK during the Second World War).

Many observers joined the ROC after service in other armed forces. Aircrew brevets from the RAF, Army Air Corps and Royal Naval Air Service were permitted to be worn on ROC uniforms, along with any medal ribbons from British or British Empire (later Commonwealth) countries. Other permitted badges were specialist trade badges such as parachute brevets, marksman badges, radio operator badges, etc. The 796 volunteer observers who served on board Defensively Equipped Merchant Ships and US Navy vessels during the D-Day landings were permitted to wear the Seaborne shoulder flash for the remainder of their service with the ROC, including where promoted to officer ranks. A handful of Seaborne Observers remained in active service with the ROC when the majority of the spare-time volunteer members were stood down in 1991. (Several Seaborne Observers purportedly lied about their age in 1941 in order to qualify for special service duty).

From 1977 the uncomfortable wartime-issue "hairy mary" RAF No.2 Battledress uniforms were replaced in a rolling programme with comfortable, modern zip-fronted 1972 pattern No.2 RAF uniforms, immediately christened as 'mothercare suits' due to the shapeless style of these loose fitting jackets. RAF-issue blue shirts with collars attached, black ties, practical woollen jerseys known as 'wooly  and additionally, for post observers only, new style green overalls and blue nylon foul weather jackets and overtrousers were issued. Standard RAF footwear was issued to all ranks below that of officer and to all spare-time officers. (Full-time officers purchased footwear at their own expense). ROC stable belts incorporating the colours of the ROC Medal ribbon were authorised by the Commandant ROC and introduced in 1985 for male observers. These were introduced as an optional, non-issue item and were purchased at the individual's expense. Another optional self-purchase item were the RAF forage cap, also called the side hat, "chip bag" or "cheese cutter". In 1983, female members were granted permission to purchase and wear the WRAF hat in place of the beret.

ROC proficiency badges 

All ROC ranks below that of Observer Officer were entitled to wear a Spitfire proficiency badge to mark success in the annual ROC Master Test examination. The first version of this test was introduced during the Second World War as a measure of competency in the field of aircraft recognition, with candidates required to correctly identify a set of aircraft silhouette cards in order to be judged proficient. (Results and names of those observers who had met the required standard were published at the rear of the ROC magazine). The insignia awarded to those who had been successful was a printed badge depicting a white Spitfire on blue/grey material. The test cards were later replaced by photographic slides projected onto a screen using a "Flash Trainer" projector. Between 1956 and 1966 the test became a mix of aircraft recognition and written answers to questions relating to the nuclear detection role. Latterly, the master test was a 100 question multiple-choice test, and separate specialist papers were provided for post and NRC observers.

The five levels of test result ranged from Failure to Basic Pass to Intermediate Pass, a First Class Pass and finally Master Pass. A score of 90% or above was required for the award of a Master Pass. On the first occasion a Master Pass was achieved, a Blue Spitfire badge would be awarded. Upon the fifth master pass a Red Spitfire was awarded with a Red Star badge added for every five master passes until the twenty fifth pass, when the combined Red Spitfire and 3 Red Stars were replaced with a Gold Spitfire. (The Gold Spitfire badge was first introduced in 1988, although it could be awarded retrospectively).

The age limits of ROC service meant that in order to achieve the coveted Gold Spitfire and 3 Gold Stars a master level pass was required during almost every year of an observer's service, assuming having joined at the minimum age. As a result, very few Gold Spitfire badges were awarded, and yet fewer Gold Stars.

Latterly in 1987 it was announced that a First Class pass in the master test would be recognised by the award of a stand-alone blue star, for those observers who had not previously achieved a master pass and the award of a Spitfire badge.

Proficiency badge progression

Royal Observer Corps Medal 

Prior to the Second World War, observers were employed by county police forces and qualified for the Special Constabulary Long Service Medal after nine years continuous service. However, following RAF Fighter Command assuming control of the ROC in 1939, this medal ceased to be awarded to members of the ROC.

In 1950, King George VI granted permission for the issue of a Royal Observer Corps Medal for twelve years continuous service. Each subsequent period of twelve years was recognised by the award of a clasp depicting a winged crown attached to the medal ribbon. Peace time service by full-time officers was calculated at a rate of 50% for qualifying years, thereby requiring up to twenty four years service to qualify for a medal or subsequent clasp. However, any war or part-time service previously undertaken by such individuals counted in full.

The medal ceased to be awarded when the ROC was stood down in December 1995.

The medal ribbon is a mix of pale blue, dark blue and silver vertical stripes, representing the pale blue of the daytime sky with a searchlight's beam in a night sky at the centre. A pattern which, together with additional outer stripes of dark blue, is repeated in the ROC stable belt.

Second World War medals 
ROC personnel who served for 1,080 days during the war qualified for the Defence Medal. The 796 members of the ROC temporarily enrolled in the Royal Navy for services afloat during the June 1944 Normandy landings qualified for the appropriate campaign medals. Most served for one or two months and were entitled to the France and Germany Star and the War Medal. Two members of the Corps were killed, one wounded and ten mentioned in despatches, and were additionally entitled to the 1939-1945 Star. A total of 235 of these D Day veterans went on to receive the ROC Medal.

Uniform and insignia gallery

Annual training

Exercises 
Several major war simulation exercises were held each year 2 x WARMON (Warning and Monitoring) one day UK exercises and the two-day INTEX (International exercise) along with other NATO countries.

Four times a year minor and limited exercises called POSTEX were held on a stop – start basis across three evenings of a week, Monday to Wednesday. Realistic simulation material was provided for realtime simulations of a nuclear attack.

Approximately every four or five years each group was subjected to a "no notice" and in depth "OPEVAL" assessment similar to an RAF "TACEVAL" or Tactical Evaluation, where a mixed team of UKWMO and ROC full-time staff would appear and evaluate all aspects of the group's planning and operations under realistic wartime conditions over a period of 48 hours.

Annual summer training camps 

After the concept was first introduced in 1948 by the then Commandant ROC, (Air Cdre Percy Bernard, 5th Earl of Bandon), annual summer training camps were held to enable spare-time volunteers, while spending a week in uniform at an RAF station, to attend a series of lectures, training courses and social events. A series of six to eight training camps would be held annually, with approximately 500 to 600 spare-time observers attending each week. Ranks below those of officer would be accommodated in vacant barracks block accommodation, while officers would be accommodated in the station Officers' Mess. Vacant offices and aircraft hangars would be converted into temporary training facilities.

A core-team of instructors, provided with pre-formatted lesson plans, would be drawn from those spare-time officers present, who in turn would be supervised by a team of up to nine full-time officers. Full-time officers would be present for the duration of the summer programme of training camps, one of which being appointed as Camp Entertainments Officer; organising events including social dances, visits to local places of interest and an end of camp grand raffle. On the last full day of each camp, a Cabinet Minister or senior RAF officer of the rank of Air Vice-Marshal or above would visit to inspect a Guard of Honour, tour the training facilities and address the assembled personnel.

A typical camp's day-to-day programme would consist of:

Sunday – Afternoon arrival of junior officers and volunteer NCO instructors.

Monday – Instructors spend day familiarising and rehearsing. Students arrive during afternoon. Formal evening opening assembly, (in uniform), followed by 'Meet and Greet' in the NAAFI club.

Tuesday – Morning parade. Lessons from 0900 to 1730, with one hour break for lunch. Evening free, with optional coach trips to local places of interest and entertainment venues.

Wednesday – Morning parade. Lessons from 0900 to 1200. Afternoon and evening free, with optional coach trips to local places of interest and entertainment venues.

Thursday – Morning parade. Lessons from 0900 to 1730, with one hour break for lunch. Evening free, with optional coach trips to local places of interest and entertainment venues.

Friday – Morning parade followed by VIP visit; Guard of Honour, tour of training area and VIP address. Afternoon lessons followed by closing assembly and grand raffle. Evening farewell social dance in NAAFI Club.

Saturday – Morning dispersal.

Initially it was not difficult for RAF stations operating on a 'care and maintenance' basis or between squadron deployments to accommodate a seasonal influx of ROC personnel. During their first few years of operation, ROC annual summer training camps had even taken place entirely under canvas. In later years, reductions in RAF manpower resulted in there being vacant accommodation and training facilities at most RAF stations in the UK, including those home to front-line operational units such as RAF Scampton and RAF Waddington. The final camp venue at RAF Watton had actually closed in 1990 and was supported by a skeleton staff of caterers, stewards and RAF Regiment security patrols, all of which were drafted in from nearby RAF stations.

There were no camps held during 1966 and 1991, when up to 3,000 observers gathered instead for Royal Reviews and garden parties at RAF Bentley Priory. In 1986, and for the only time in the history of ROC annual summer training camps, the RAF was unable to provide an RAF station capable of providing the facilities and accommodation required. The ROC then took the unusual step of locating the camp at the Medical Faculty within Newcastle University, with observers being accommodated in student halls of residence. A temporary bar facility was added to the senior lecturers' dining room, which itself functioned as an officer's mess.

Until 1984 the camp training programme consisted of approximately twenty lessons, each concerned with distinct and unrelated subjects. From 1985 onwards, the training syllabus was reorganised as a series of five or six concentrated mini-courses concerned with specific subjects which observers would study throughout the entire week, thus permitting individual subjects to be taught in greater detail. Subjects included Techniques of Instruction (TOI), First Aid, Triangulation, Transition to War (TTW) and Communications Management. UKWMO Assistant Sector Controllers provided a 'Warning Officers' course for control observers, detailing the UKWMO Warning Team's role and responsibilities in the event of war.

Training camp venues

Joint training events 
On at least one occasion during the mid-1980s, ROC personnel were briefly called upon to resume their historic role in visually identifying aircraft for the purpose of air defence. The Royal Artillery, conducting exercises at the Otterburn Training Area involving the deployment of the Rapier surface-to-air missile, invited personnel from the ROC to assist Rapier crews with aircraft identification. The exercises involved both rotary and fixed-wing aircraft conducting simulated attacks on high-value ground targets, the defence of which was tasked to the Rapier crews.

Early versions of the Rapier missile system relied heavily upon the optical acquisition of targets and also suffered problems with the Identification Friend or Foe (IFF) system. The avoidance of friendly fire incidents required an advanced level of aircraft recognition skills on the part of Rapier crews; a skill which those ROC personnel selected to attend deftly demonstrated and in turn passed on to those Rapier crews to which they were assigned.

Similar voluntary organisations overseas 
 
Organisations similar to the ROC were formed elsewhere during the Second World War, including the Ground Observer Corps, (USA), the Aircraft Identity Corps, (Canada), and the Volunteer Air Observers Corps, (Australia). However, unlike the Royal Observer Corps, most of these organisations had been disbanded by the end of the 1950s.

Following the Second World War, the Danish Home Guard also sought to develop an organisation with a similar role to that of the ROC. Links were formed by the ROC with the Luftmeldekorpset (LMK), the Danish Air Reporting Corps, who also performed a similar nuclear warning role in Denmark whilst retaining the aircraft recognition role due to the proximity of Warsaw Pact countries. Aircraft recognition competitions between the LMK and ROC took place annually until 1991, despite the ROC no longer having an operational role of aircraft recognition. Honours remained roughly even over the history of the competitions, with the four-man ROC team taking the trophy in the final contest. Liaison visits to the LMKHQ proved popular, particularly as it was located in the basement of the main Carlsberg brewery in Copenhagen, with the LMK mess having free lager piped direct from the factory above. (The LMK was disbanded in 2004).

Stand down and legacy 
Following the 1990 defence spending review Options for Change, the main field force of the ROC's monitoring post and group control personnel were stood down on 30 September 1991. The previous day, the original 1966 ROC Royal Banner was laid up at St Clement Danes Church, London, with attending ROC personnel conducting a slow-march, (Skywatch being the ROC regimental quick-march), while carrying the banner to its final resting place, where it remains on display. (A replacement banner had been presented previously by Queen Elizabeth II at a Royal Review of the ROC in July 1991). The ROC, along with the UKWMO, was officially disestablished following what was described by The Queen at the 1991 Royal Review as "the end of the Cold War". This move was linked to a Government press release which referred to "possible future developments and improvements in automated nuclear explosion and fallout detection from remote sensors".

Of the remaining 170 full-time ROC uniformed and civilian staff, many were transferred to other appointments within the Ministry of Defence and other UK Government departments, some opted to take early retirement, however the majority were made redundant. The Senior Administration Officer (S Ad O) and Personnel Services Officer (P Serv O) at HQROC undertook an extensive campaign of arranging relocation or retirement courses for staff from all over the UK. The S Ad O and an Observer Lieutenant remained in post to administer the reduced ROC contingent under a revised RAF structure. A massive exercise in recalling instruments, equipment, furniture and stores from all monitoring posts and controls took place over a period of nine months, controlled by the HQROC Supply Officer. Arrangements were made with the Ministry of Defence and RAF Historical Branch to archive ROC files, documents and historical memorabilia at various locations across the country.

Only the Nuclear Reporting Cell (NRC) elements of the ROC remained in service which, working alongside major armed forces headquarters, themselves entered a new and highly uncertain phase. Reduced to fewer than 260 members, the 16 retained NRCs now found themselves tasked with the daunting challenge of providing a comprehensive Nuclear, Biological and Chemical (NBC) warfare analysis and warning service for the Military Home Commands, on a reserve-manned basis as NBCCs but operating without the countrywide flow of data from posts and controls.

The removal of Home Office involvement in the ROC from 1991 onwards resulted in those "Remnant Elements" becoming effectively a single reserve Directly Administered Unit within RAF Strike Command (RAFSTC). For the final four years of its existence the role of Commandant ROC became a secondary appointment held by the Senior Air Staff Officer (SASO) of No. 11 Group RAF. All remaining members of the ROC were required to remove their original ROC Group designations from their RAF uniforms, and accept moves towards changes in conditions of service during any Transition-To-War (TTW) which would make them effectively members of the Royal Auxiliary Air Force (RAuxAF), with protected rights. As a direct result, closer links were forged between the ROC and war-appointable flights of the Royal Air Force Volunteer Reserve (RAFVR).

Despite having successfully built upon the extensive NBC reporting trials, undertaken with the RAF Regiment, and meeting full NATO standards and evaluations (STANAGs and OPEVALs), the conclusion reached by the UK MoD was that retention of the ROC in its NBC Cell role was "desirable, but not essential in the existing format". As a consequence, the remaining part-time members of the ROC were stood down on 31 December 1995, following the laying-up ceremony conducted for the 1991 ROC Royal Banner in the Rotunda at RAF College Cranwell on 8 December 1995, where it remains on display alongside other stood-down Air Force units and squadrons which remain subject to possible future reactivation. Headquarters ROC at RAF Bentley Priory finally closed on 31 March 1996, after all administrative winding up tasks were completed. Assisted by the Senior ROC Officer (SROCO), Observer Commander N A Greig, MBE, the honour of being the last Commandant of the ROC fell to Air Commodore Martin K Widdowson RAF, who held the position jointly with his appointment as Senior Air Staff Officer (SASO) of the newly combined No. 11/18 Group RAF.

After the Corps 
Several monitoring posts across the UK have since been bought or leased, re-equipped and opened to the public as museums. Some posts situated in scenic rural locations have proved popular with those seeking permanent locations for holiday caravans, i.e. the mostly intact Penrith monitoring post in the Carlisle group was sold at auction in April 2008 for £182,000.

The majority of control buildings have been sold into private ownership and demolished or converted to other uses, such as 17 Group Wrexham that is now a recording studio, 16 Group Shrewsbury is a veterinary hospital and 1 Group Maidstone is a solicitor's storage archive. Several others still remain, albeit for the most part abandoned and derelict. There are two notable exceptions. 20 Group York's semi-sunken control building that has been adopted by English Heritage as a museum of the ROC and its cold war activities, and is open to the public from Wednesday – Sundays from Easter until November, and Saturdays and Sundays from November onwards. 28 Group Dundee’s control bunker is managed by 28 Group Observed (SCIO) and has been restored to its 1991 condition. Private tours can be arranged via the charity's website and facebook page. The York museum closed for several months during 2008, when an unknown mould was discovered in the data centre, but reopened in October after investigations showed the mould to be harmless. It was forced to close again in August 2015 for one month due to serious flooding after a prolonged period of heavy rain..

RAF Bentley Priory, home of HQROC for the entire history of the Royal Observer Corps, closed in May 2008 and will be developed as a private hotel or luxury apartments, with the historic officers' mess rooms and a selection of ROC items retained as a public museum. With effect from July 2011, the ROC Museum, Winchester, assumed responsibility from the MoD for the maintenance, storage and dissemination of information relating to ROC Service Records of those individuals who served with the Corps.

ROC Association 

In 1986 the Royal Observer Corps Association (ROCA) was established with membership open to members of the ROC to provide close and continuing links between former ROC members. The association is organised on a regional basis with representation in each of the twenty five groups. Each group produces and distributes a magazine several times a year to keep the membership informed of developments and both local or national news.

The stated aims of the association are:

The association has actively continued since the ROC disbanded and still provides an additional contact point for ex-observers and their dependants. The ROCA also organises the annual reunion weekend each October at a suitable holiday resort hotel and provides an ROC contingent to the annual Remembrance Sunday event at the Cenotaph in London.

Many control and post crews have formed sub-groups of the ROCA and have continued to meet on a weekly or monthly basis throughout the years since the initial stand down in 1991. Meeting at local Royal Air Forces Association Clubs or hotels, they invite visiting speakers, or arrange visits to local places of interest. Local ROCA members turn out for Remembrance Sunday and parades all over the country, with former members being permitted to wear the ROC beret and cap badge, together with any medals.

During early 2008, ROCA 17 Group (North Wales) and 4 Group (Colchester) seceded from the national organisation. Both groups rejoined the association in 2012.

Commemorating 'The Corps' 

On 12 September 2008, a replica of a No. 41 Squadron Spitfire MkIIA, wearing the "Observer Corps" badge and title, was installed as gate guardian at RAF High Wycombe. The original aircraft on which the replica is based; EB-Z ser. no P7666, was the personal aircraft of Sqn/Ldr Donald Finlay, Commanding Officer of No. 41 Squadron at RAF Hornchurch. This aircraft being one of two which Observer Corps personnel raised sufficient funds in order to purchase for the RAF at the start of World War II. (In 2010 a BAe Harrier GR9A was adorned with the tail code EB-Z and title "Observer Corps" in order to mark the 70th anniversary of the Battle of Britain. Harrier ZG857 displayed these additional markings during the months which preceded the type's retirement from RAF service in March 2011).

The ROC has twice been commemorated by the naming of railway locomotives. Constructed in 1946, the Battle of Britain class steam locomotive no.34050 was named "Royal Observer Corps" in February 1948, and was presented with an ROC Long Service Medal ribbon at Waterloo station on 2 July 1961 by Air Commodore C M Wight-Boycott. Withdrawn from service and scrapped in 1965, the locomotive's nameplate survived and now forms part of the collection at the RAF Museum. Constructed in 1966, the British Rail Class 73 electro-diesel locomotive no.73137 was from 1985 until 1999 named "Royal Observer Corps". Marking the 60th anniversary of the founding of the Corps, Air Chief Marshal Sir David Craig undertook the naming ceremony at Waterloo Station on 30 October 1985.

Several Group Control surface buildings which were demolished to make way for private housing developments have been commemorated by the naming of streets, including Observer Court, Prestwick, Observer Close, Truro, and Observer Close, Bedford. The area of housing development at Kennet Heath, Thatcham, on the former site of RAF Thatcham, (until 1999 a distribution facility owned by the Defence Communication Services Agency), includes Observer Drive among the military-themed street names of the David Wilson Homes development. Royal Observer Way forms the access road to the Tesco superstore in Seaton, Devon.

The Royal Banner, (displayed at St Clement Danes Church), the stained glass window at Bentley Priory, those former posts, group controls, MoD bunkers and other sites operating as museums, and those individuals who attend memorial parades as members of the ROC Association, continue to provide a link to the ROC and its distinguished past roles in contributing to the defence of the United Kingdom. The ROC and those who have served throughout its history are commemorated at the National Memorial Arboretum, where members of the ROC Association regularly undertake practical grounds maintenance of the ROC grove.

See also

ROC articles 
 Commandant Royal Observer Corps
 List of ROC Group Headquarters and UKWMO Sector controls
 List of Royal Observer Corps / United Kingdom Warning and Monitoring Organisation Posts
 Operational instruments of the Royal Observer Corps
 RAF Bentley Priory
 Royal Observer Corps Medal
 Royal Observer Corps Monitoring Post
 Skywatch march
 United Kingdom Warning and Monitoring Organisation

Duties and methods 
 Aircraft recognition
 Bomb Power Indicator
 Fixed Survey Meter
 Four-minute warning
 Ground Zero Indicator

Similar organisations 
 Aircraft Detection Corps Newfoundland
 Aircraft Identity Corps (Canada)
 Civil Air Patrol (USA)
 Ground Observer Corps (USA)
 Luftmeldekorpset
 Volunteer Air Observers Corps (Australia)

References

Main sources 
 Wood, Derek (1975 and revised 1992). Attack Warning Red (Rev. ed.). Portsmouth; Carmichael and Sweet Ltd. . The History of the ROC 
 Buckton, Henry (1993). Forewarned is Forearmed, an Official Tribute and History of the Royal Observer Corps. Ashford; Buchan and Enright. .

External links 

History
 ROC Association A History
 D-Day – the ROC's part Combined Ops – Seaborne volunteers
 ROC History 1925–1992
 The Royal Observer Corps Remembered, Mark Russell
 ROC in Scotland A project documenting its history
 
 TRHS versus ROC & UKWMO monitoring posts Information about ROC after World War II in Czech (ROC v poválečném vývoji, Česky)
 TheTimeChamber A History & Photos
 York bunker English Heritage

Technical
 Royal Observer Corps – No. 6 Group Museum, Norfolk Aviation Heritage Collection
 Battle of Britain Control Systems Part of the RAF BoB website.
 Subterranea Britannica Nuclear role and database of posts
 UK Warning and Monitoring Organisation includes underground post description
 Identification by radio and radar in the Second World War
 pdfs of ROC documents

Other
 Forewarned is Forearmed (date unknown) – Royal Observer Corps MOD film AF9441 on YouTube

Ground-based air defence observation corps
1925 establishments in the United Kingdom
Military units and formations established in 1941
Military units and formations disestablished in 1995
 
Cold War military history of the United Kingdom
Military units and formations of the Royal Air Force in World War II
Military units and formations of the Cold War
Operation Overlord
1995 disestablishments in the United Kingdom